Light of His Life (German: Sein Lebenslicht) is a 1921 Austrian silent film directed by Max Neufeld and starring Liane Haid, Eugen Neufeld and Karl Ehmann.

Cast
 Liane Haid
 Eugen Neufeld
 Karl Ehmann
 Eduard Sekler
 Josef Recht

References

Bibliography
 Parish, Robert. Film Actors Guide. Scarecrow Press, 1977.

External links

1921 films
Austrian silent feature films
Films directed by Max Neufeld
Austrian black-and-white films